The 26th International Emmy Awards took place on November 23, 1998 in New York City and hosted by Dutch comedian Hans Liberg. The award ceremony, presented by the International Academy of Television Arts and Sciences (IATAS), honors all programming produced and originally aired outside the United States. Among the presenters were John Ritter, Alan Thicke, Linda Purl and Joanne Woodward.

Winners

References

External links 
 
 26th Int’l Emmy noms unveiled
 Swedish drama tops Int’l Emmys

International Emmy Awards ceremonies
International
International